Radu Rosetti may refer to:

Radu Rosetti (1853–1926), historian and politician
Radu D. Rosetti (1874–1964), poet, playwright and attorney
Radu R. Rosetti (1877–1949), general and military historian, son of Radu Rosetti